The Night Chancers is the sixth studio album by English musician Baxter Dury. It was released on 20 March 2020 under [PIAS] France LE LABEL for the world and under Heavenly Recordings for the UK, Ireland and USA.

Background
The album was recorded in May 2019 at Hoxa Studios in West Hampstead, England.

Critical reception
The Night Chancers was met with universal acclaim from critics. At Metacritic, which assigns a weighted average rating out of 100 to reviews from mainstream publications, this release received an average score of 86, based on 13 reviews. The aggregator AnyDecentMusic? gave the album 8.1 out of 10, based on its assessment of the critical consensus. Album of the Year assessed the critical consensus 82 out of 100, based on 13 reviews.

Track listing

Charts

References

2020 albums
Baxter Dury albums
Heavenly Recordings albums